Pond's is an American brand of beauty and health care products, currently owned by Unilever.

History
Pond's Cream was invented in the United States as a patent medicine by pharmacist Theron T. Pond (1800–1852) of Utica, New York, in 1846. Mr. Pond extracted a healing tea from witch hazel [Hamamelis spp.] which he discovered could heal small cuts and other ailments. The product was named "Golden Treasure." After Theron died, it would soon be known as "Pond's Extract."

In 1849, the T. T. Pond Company was formed with Pond and other investors. Soon after, he sold his portion of the company because of failing health. He died in 1852. In 1914, the company was incorporated under the name Pond's Extract Company.

The company then moved to Connecticut establishing its manufacturing center there. Later it moved its sales office to New York City.

In 1886, Pond's began to advertise nationally. They advertised under the name of Pond's Healing until 1910.

By the twentieth century, the company's main emphasis was selling cosmetics products. The "Pond's Vanishing Cream" and the "Pond's Cold Cream" were created, marking the entrance of Pond's products into the facial care industry. Today Pond's is sold around the world. Its largest markets are in Spain and in Asia, including India, Japan and Thailand.

1910s 

By 1910, Pond's was a well established brand among Americans. Concentrating mostly on their vanishing cream, the Pond's company began an ad campaign that would become popular because of the celebrities involved in it. "Pond's Healing" took a back seat to "Pond's Vanishing Cream", as "Pond's Healing" and "Pond's Cold Cream" would be announced in small print under the "Pond's Vanishing Cream" advertisements.

By 1914, mentions of "Pond's Healing" were taken off the ads, and the Pond's company began to advertise "Pond's Vanishing Cream" and "Pond's Cold Cream" together, making sure to explain each cream's different purposes on the new ads. One particular ad line read "Every normal skin needs these two creams".

As a result of the new campaign, "Pond's Vanishing Cream" had a 60% increase in sales during 1915, and "Pond's Cold Cream" had a 27% increase.

1920s
By 1922, sales of the products had gone down, as many believed that such an easily available product could not perform as well as other, "designer" products. Because of this, the Pond's Company then targeted royalty, politicians and people of high class stature to become advertisers for the company. In addition, these ads were printed in magazines such as Vogue and others, to give customers a feeling that they really were getting a quality product for a fair price.

In 1923, Queen Marie of Romania visited the United States, and she enjoyed the product so much that in 1925 she wrote to the Pond's Company requesting more supplies. Her letter was, in turn, used for advertisement, and Her Majesty joined the list of celebrities who had previously sponsored the products.

Around the time of Queen Marie's visit to the United States, the Pond's Company began to place samples of their products at their magazine ads, and the characters of "Peter" and "Polly Ponds" were created, as part of their campaign to entice normal people into buying their cream again. The marketing strategies proved successful, as sales of the Pond's facial creams went up again.

"Peter" and "Polly Ponds" disappeared from the company's ad campaigns after 1925.

1930s 
During the Depression Era of the 1930s, the company's business slowed somewhat. However, the Pond's company expanded slowly, adding Face Powder and Angel Face products.

First merger 
Pond's Company was merged in 1955 with the Chesebrough Manufacturing Company, which had a good percentage of brands in the facial care field.  With this merger, "Pond's Creams" became sisters with the Cutex nail polish brand and the Matchabelli perfumes.

With the Chesebrough Manufacturing Company in command, "Pond's Creams" became available at many supermarkets across the United States. The creams' bottles consisted of small, glass bottles with a round cap. The bottles were recognizable by their distinctive colors, usually in green, blue or white. The bottle design is still in use by the Pond's brand.

Second merger 
In 1987, the Chesebrough Manufacturing Company, popularly known as "Chesebrough-Ponds", was acquired by Anglo-Dutch company Unilever, giving "Pond's Creams" a more international reach.

References

External links

 Pond's official website
 Pond's Institute, UK re-branding

Unilever brands
Products introduced in 1846